Frederick of Sicily may refer to:
Frederick II, Holy Roman Emperor (1194-1250), also known as Frederick I of Sicily 
Frederick III of Sicily (1272–1337), self-styled the third despite being the second Frederick to rule Sicily (Trinacria)
Frederick the Simple (1341–1377), third Frederick to rule Sicily (Trinacria)
Frederick IV of Naples (1452–1504), continued Neapolitan claim to Kingdom of Sicily